EnBW Baltic 1 is the first commercial offshore wind farm of Germany in the Baltic Sea. Siemens supplied 21 SWT 2.3-93 wind turbines for the 48.3 megawatt wind farm. Work started in July 2010; the wind farm was officially commissioned on 2 May 2011.

Due to the Kriegers Flak Combined Grid Solution, power from Sweden (via Zealand), the 600 MW Kriegers Flak, the 288 MW Baltic 2 is sent via Baltic 1 to Germany, and is synchronized to the Nordic grid (not the German grid) via a 150 kV 400 MW alternating current subsea cable.

Generation

See also

Baltic 2 Offshore Wind Farm
Wind power in Germany
List of offshore wind farms in Germany
List of offshore wind farms
List of offshore wind farms in the Baltic Sea

References

External links
LORC Knowledge - Datasheet for Baltic 1 Offshore Wind Farm
"Life Currents", a 2019 Deutsche Welle television program discussing alternative energy narrated in English;  A segment describing Baltic 1 begins at 10:10

Wind farms in Germany
EnBW
Offshore wind farms in the Baltic Sea
Energy infrastructure completed in 2011
2011 establishments in Germany